The Hallowing of Nestorius is one of the Eucharistic liturgies used in the Church of the East.  It is currently employed in the Holy Qurbana of the Chaldean Catholic Church, Assyrian Church of the East, Ancient Church of the East, and the Syro-Malabar Church, which are descendants of the Church of the East. It is a part of the East Syriac Rite, formally attributed to Nestorius, Patriarch of Constantinople and is traditionally  celebrated for the Feast of the Epiphany, Commemoration of St. John the Baptist, Commemoration of the Greek Teachers: Mar Diodore, Mar Theodore the interpreter and Mar Nestorius, and also for the Wednesday liturgy of the Rogation of the Ninevites, and the Feast of the Passover (Holy Thursday).

The authorship is questioned and purportedly Pseudepigrapha.

See also
Liturgy of Addai and Mari (or the Hallowing of the Apostles)
Hallowing of Theodore of Mopsuestia

References

External links

Assyrian Church of the East
Eastern Christian liturgies
October observances
Nestorian texts

Church of the East
Syro-Malabar Catholic Church 
Ancient Church of the East 
Chaldean Catholic Church 
Anaphoras (liturgy) 
Syriac Christianity 
Eastern Christian liturgy 
Eastern Christianity